The Big 3 is an album by vibraphonist Milt Jackson, guitarist Joe Pass and bassist Ray Brown recorded in 1975 and released on the Pablo label.

Reception
The Allmusic review by Scott Yanow awarded the album 5 stars stating "These three masterful players recorded together in many settings during the Pablo years, but only this once as a trio. The colorful repertoire acts as a device for the musicians to construct some brilliant bop-based solos".

Track listing
 "The Pink Panther" (Henry Mancini) - 5:52 
 "Nuages" (Django Reinhardt) - 7:26 
 "Blue Bossa" (Kenny Dorham) - 5:03 
 "Come Sunday" (Duke Ellington) - 3:12 
 "Wave" (Antonio Carlos Jobim) - 6:50 
 "Moonglow" (Eddie DeLange, Will Hudson, Irving Mills) - 4:57 
 "You Stepped Out of a Dream" (Nacio Herb Brown, Gus Kahn) - 3:58 
 "Blues for Sammy" (Milt Jackson) - 6:25 
Recorded in Los Angeles, California on August 25, 1975 by Angel Balestier

Personnel
Milt Jackson – vibes
Joe Pass - guitar
Ray Brown - bass

References 

Pablo Records albums
Milt Jackson albums
Joe Pass albums
Ray Brown (musician) albums
Albums produced by Norman Granz
1975 live albums